Relf is a southern English surname. It stems from the old French given name Riulf, which was derived from Germanic words ric (power) and wulf (wolf). Notable people with the surname include:

Albert Relf (1874–1937), British cricketer
Bob Relf (1937–2007), African American R&B and soul musician
Carolyn Relf, Canadian geologist
Chris Relf (born 1989), American football quarterback
Ernest Relf (1888–1918), English cricketer active from 1912 to 1914
Jane Relf (born 1947), British singer, sister of Keith Relf of the Yardbirds
Keith Relf (1943–1976), English musician, lead vocalist and harmonica player for the Yardbirds
Patricia Relf, American author of numerous children's books
Robert Relf (1924–2014), English political activist of the far right
Robert Relf (cricketer) (1883–1965), English first class cricketer
Robert Relf (rugby league) (born 1971), Australian rugby league footballer
The Relf Sisters (Minnie Lee and Mary Alice Relf, born ca. 1960), subjects of a U.S. class-action lawsuit

See also
Relph, a variant of the surname Relf
Relfs Bluff, Arkansas, a populated place in the United States

References